Coumaphos is a nonvolatile, fat-soluble phosphorothioate with ectoparasiticide properties: it kills insects and mites. It is well known by a variety of brand names as a dip or wash, used on farm and domestic animals to control ticks, mites, flies and fleas.

It is also used to control Varroa mites in honey bee colonies, though in many areas it is falling out of favor as the mites develop resistance and as the residual toxicity effects are becoming better understood.

In Australia, its registration as suited to home veterinary use was cancelled by the Australian Pesticides and Veterinary Medicines Authority in June 2004 after the manufacturer failed to show it was safe for use on pets.

The compound has been linked to neurological problems in bees, and may be a factor in colony collapse.

It is classified as an extremely hazardous substance in the United States as defined in Section 302 of the U.S. Emergency Planning and Community Right-to-Know Act (42 U.S.C. 11002), and is subject to strict reporting requirements by facilities which produce, store, or use it in significant quantities.

References

External links
 Coumaphos, US Environmental Protection Agency

Acetylcholinesterase inhibitors
Organophosphate insecticides
Coumarin drugs
Chloroarenes
Organothiophosphate esters